Digitalis atlantica is a species of flowering plant in the family Plantaginaceae. It is native to Algeria.

Toxicity 
Like all species in the Digitalis genus, Digitalis atlantica is also toxic. However, this particular species seems to have the lowest cardenolide content.

References 

atlantica
Flora of Algeria